State Highway 9, abbreviated as SH-9, OK-9, or simply Highway 9, is a major east–west highway in the U.S. state of Oklahoma. Spanning across the central part of the state, SH-9 begins at the Texas state line near Madge, Oklahoma, and ends at the Arkansas state line near Fort Smith, Arkansas. State Highway 9 is a major highway around the Norman area. At , SH-9 is Oklahoma's second-longest state highway (second to State Highway 3).

Route description

West of Interstate 35

East of Lone Wolf, the highway forms a concurrency with SH-44. Near Hobart, SH-9 overlaps US-183 for (again going northward) before splitting off again.

Continuing east, SH-9 passes through Gotebo, Mountain View, and Carnegie. Around Fort Cobb, Oklahoma, the highway begins  of travel to the south. There, the route links up with the concurrent U.S. Highways 62 and 281. While US-281 will split off in Anadarko, SH-9 and US-62 remain concurrent until Newcastle. In Chickasha, US-277 joins to form another three-route concurrency with US-62 and SH-9. On the eastern edge of Chickasha, US-62/277/SH-9 have an interchange with I-44, or more commonly known as the H.E. Bailey Turnpike.

Traveling northeast from Chickasha, US-62/277/SH-9 are routed to the town of Blanchard. Four miles later, SH-9 splits away from the two U.S. routes at a diamond interchange that also serves as the eastern terminus of the H.E. Bailey Turnpike Spur. SH-9 remains without any concurrent routes until Goldsby. The section of road east of US-62/277, recently upgraded to a four-lane divided highway, provides a link from the H.E. Bailey Turnpike Spur to Interstate 35. At the interstate, SH-9 merges onto I-35 northbound to cross the Canadian River into Norman.

East of Interstate 35

Through Norman, Highway 9 serves as a major artery providing access to the University of Oklahoma campus (in particular, the Lloyd Noble Center). Around the area, the route is a four-lane divided expressway (with surface crossings and stoplights). However, after a full interchange with 72nd Avenue SE, the road becomes a two lane highway again.

SH-9 continues eastward, passing Lake Thunderbird State Park, before reaching the towns of Tecumseh and Seminole. The road intersects the Indian Nation Turnpike near Hanna, and US-69 near Eufaula. SH-9 provides access to the south side of Lake Eufaula before reaching Stigler.

Both remain concurrent, until the highway ends at the Arkansas border. After passing the Arkansas state line, State Highway 9 becomes I-540, and US-271 continues over the state line concurrent with the Interstate.

History

Officially designated on August 24, 1924, the original route encompassed all of current SH-9 west of Blanchard. East of Blanchard, SH-9 followed a more northerly route. Bypassing Norman, SH-9 ran north to Oklahoma City before going east through Harrah, Meeker, Prague, Henryetta, and Checotah. The highway ended at the original SH-3 in Spiro. Upon the creation of the United States Numbered Routes system in 1926, the section between Oklahoma City and Warner was overlaid with US-266. Four years later in 1930, SH-9 was truncated to Chickasha. By this time, much of the route had become part of US-62.

On 1935-08-27, the route was extended eastward, taking over the original SH-37.  SH-9's eastern terminus became SH-48 near Seminole. On 1937-08-25, the route was brought further east to end at US-69 in Eufaula. Part of the newly commissioned section was rescinded on 1937-10-19, when a small segment just east of SH-48 and the entire Hughes County portion were dropped from the highway. These sections were re-added on 1938-09-27.

SH-9 was extended eastward twice in the route's history. The first extension occurred on 1941-02-26, and extended SH-9 to SH-2 at Whitefield. The final extension brought SH-9 to the Arkansas state line on 1941-11-12. The only major realignment in SH-9's history since 1941 was the Norman expressway bypass, which was designated as SH-9 on 1971-11-08.

After the I-40 bridge disaster, parts of SH-9 in eastern Oklahoma served as an emergency detour for eastbound I-40 traffic. All eastbound traffic was routed along the section of SH-9 between SH-2 in Whitefield and US-59. In addition, the section of SH-9 between US-59 and the Arkansas state line were used for eastbound traffic for commercial trucks.

Discussions to widen SH-9 to four lanes east of US-77 in Norman began in 2008. The City of Norman and ODOT have conflict in their proposals for the design of the widened highway. ODOT has proposed a  paved median, with  shoulders to accommodate bicyclists. Norman's proposal includes a grass median and a separate bike path along the north side of the right-of-way, running from 24th Avenue S.E. to Lake Thunderbird. ODOT criticized the city's plan as too expensive. The city then proposed, with a narrower raised concrete median and separate bike path. By 2014, the plan for the widening had been finalized and work had begun from US 77 eastward.

The I-35 and SH-9 West interchange in Goldsby is also expected to be reconfigured into a Diverging diamond interchange. The new design is expected to "accommodate large volumes of turning traffic by shifting traffic to the left side of a divided roadway through a series of coordinated signals for safer and more efficient left turns." This follows a large project that reconfigured the I-35 exits at West Lindsey Street into Single Point Urban Interchange and the SH-9 east exit to a trumpet interchange in Norman. That project started in March 2015 and was completed and opened in October 2017.

Spurs
State Highway 9 creates three spur highways throughout the state. Additionally, it has two business routes, serving towns the main route bypasses. These routes are:
Business SH-9, a three-mile (5 km) loop through Hobart.
 Another instance of Business SH-9 that loops through Gotebo. (This is not shown on the state highway map.)

SH-9A is a designation for three distinct highways:
 A highway that intersects SH-9 in Earlsboro and links the parent highway to I-40 and SH-39 in Konawa. The spur also passes through the town of Maud.
 A connector highway from US-69 to SH-9 south of Eufaula.
 A spur route to SH-112 in Arkoma. This section is a former alignment of U.S. Highway 271.

Junction list

References

External links

OKHighways.com -- OK 9
OKHighways.com -- OK 9A (Seminole/Pottawatomie County)
OKHighways.com -- OK 9A (Pittsburg County)
OKHighways.com -- OK 9A (Le Flore County)
OKHighways.com -- Business OK 9 (Hobart)
OKHighways.com -- Business OK 9 (Gotebo)

009
Transportation in Cleveland County, Oklahoma
Transportation in Le Flore County, Oklahoma
Transportation in Harmon County, Oklahoma
Transportation in Greer County, Oklahoma
Transportation in Kiowa County, Oklahoma
Transportation in Caddo County, Oklahoma
Transportation in Grady County, Oklahoma
Transportation in McClain County, Oklahoma
Transportation in Pottawatomie County, Oklahoma
Transportation in Seminole County, Oklahoma
Transportation in Hughes County, Oklahoma
Transportation in McIntosh County, Oklahoma
Transportation in Haskell County, Oklahoma